Condition of the Heart is the third studio album by American Kashif. It was released in 1985 on Arista Records. The album includes the hit singles "Condition of the Heart", "Dancing in the Dark (Heart to Heart)" and Anti-Apartheid song "Botha Botha". Condition of the Heart was digitally remastered for the first time in 2012 by Funky Town Grooves with three bonus tracks.

Critical reception

AllMusic editor Ed Hogan rated Condition of the Heart two out of five stars and called it a "mellow album of '80s R&B."

Track listing
All tracks produced by Kashif.

Personnel 
 Kashif – vocals, backing vocals, synthesizers, Synclavier, synth bass, drums, arrangements, vocal arrangements 
 Brian Morgan – synthesizers, Synclavier vocals, guitars, synth bass
 V. Jeffrey Smith – synthesizers, Synclavier vocals, guitars, synth bass, drums, saxophones, backing vocals, vocal arrangements  
 Shelley Scruggs – synthesizers, backing vocals 
 John Harris – Synclavier programming, Synclavier vocals
 Bill Keenan – Synclavier programming
 Ira Siegel – guitars 
 Bashiri Johnson – drums, percussion 
 Chris Parker – drums 
 Kenny G – saxophone on "Love on the Rise"
 Kejia Bostic – backing vocals 
 Angela Clemmons – backing vocals 
 Andrea Dawkins Duvernex – backing vocals 
 Yogi Lee – backing vocals 
 Cindy Mizelle – backing vocals 
 Meli'sa Morgan – backing vocals 
 B.J. Nelson – backing vocals 
 Audrey Wheeler – backing vocals

Production 
 Kashif – producer, engineer 
 Brian Morgan – assistant producer 
 Shelley Scruggs – assistant producer 
 V. Jeffrey Smith – assistant producer
 Darroll Gustamachio – engineer, mix engineer 
 John Harris – engineer, mix engineer, assistant engineer
 Alec Head – engineer, mix engineer
 Steve Goldman – mix engineer 
 Michael O'Reilly – mix engineer 
 Eddie Garcia – assistant engineer 
 Michael Marangelo – assistant engineer 
 Larry Smith – assistant engineer 
 Jerry Garszva – audio design 
 Bruce Robbins – studio maintenance 
 Michelle Harris – production coordinator 
 Sari Johnson – production coordinator 
 Ria Lewerke – art direction 
 Sue Reilly – design
 Aaron Rapoport – photography 
 Gary Evans – hair stylist 
 Quitefire – make-up

Charts

References

External links
 
 Condition of the Heart at Discogs

1985 albums
Kashif (musician) albums